Naegok-dong is a dong, neighbourhood of Seocho-gu in Seoul, South Korea.

Education 
 High Schools
 Daniel High School
 Elementary Schools
 Naegok Elementary School
 Eonnam Elementary School

See also 
Administrative divisions of South Korea

References

External links
Seocho-gu official website
Seocho-gu map at the Seocho-gu official website
 The Naegok-dong Resident office

Neighbourhoods of Seocho District